The modern pentathlon at the 2004 Summer Olympics was held from 26 to 27 August 2004, at the Olympic Modern Pentathlon Centre at the Goudi Olympic Complex.  The men's and women's events each involved 32 athletes, an increase of eight from the previous games.

The Eastern European nations continued to dominate in the men's event as Andrey Moiseev won the gold medal, followed by Lithuania's Andrejus Zadneprovskis and Libor Capalini of the Czech Republic, who each obtained the silver and bronze medals, respectively. Zsuzsanna Vörös of Hungary, on the other hand, won the gold medal in the women's event, while Latvia's Jeļena Rubļevska, who finished eighth in Sydney, took the silver. Georgina Harland of Great Britain won the nation's third overall Olympic medal in the women's event, as she claimed the bronze.

Format
Modern pentathlon contained five events; pistol shooting, épée fencing, 200 m freestyle swimming, show jumping, and a 3 km cross-country run.  They were held in that order, with each segment awarding points to competitors based on their performance in the segment.  The points from each of the events were summed to give a final ranking; in addition, the running segment at the end of the day used a staggered start designed so that the order in which runners finished would be the same as their ranking by total points.

Qualification
Qualification for the modern pentathlon event was run by the International Modern Pentathlon Union (UIPM).  32 men and 32 women qualified, with a limit of 2 competitors per gender for each National Olympic Committee.  As a minimum, men were required to have earned 5,100 points either on 1 June 2004 UIPM ranking list or at a continental qualifying competition.  Women needed 4,800 points.  The pentathlete must have also earned one of 30 qualifying places at a tournament or one of 2 invitational places.

Qualification tournaments were:
 2002 World Cup Final - first place
 2003 World Championships - top three places
 2003 World Cup Final - top two places
 2003-04 Continental championships:
 Africa - first place
 Asia - top two places
 Oceania - first place
 North America - first place
 South America - first place
 Europe - top three places
 2004 World Championships - top nine places
 2004 World Cups - top two places in each of the three competitions

In addition, the host nation was guaranteed at least one competitor in each gender if none qualified as above, and the Tripartite Commission allocated one invitational place.  If more than one of the qualification places was won by a single competitor or more than two were won by a single NOC, the field was brought up to 32 competitors by selecting the highest-rated pentathlete on the UIPM ranking list of 1 June 2004.

Medalists

Medal summary

Medal table

References

External links
Official result book – Modern pentathlon

 
2004 Summer Olympics events
2004